Cachapa is a traditional dish made from maize flour from Venezuela. Like arepas, they are popular at roadside stands. They can be made like pancakes of fresh corn dough, or wrapped in dry corn leaves and boiled (cachapa de hoja). The most common varieties are made with fresh ground corn mixed into a thick batter and cooked on a budare, like pancakes; the cachapa is slightly thicker and lumpier because of the pieces from corn kernels.

Cachapas are traditionally eaten with queso de mano (hand[made] cheese), a soft, mozzarella-like cheese, and occasionally with fried pork chicharrón on the side. Cachapas can be very elaborate, some including different kinds of cheese, milky cream, or jam. They can be prepared as an appetizer, generally with margarine, or as a full breakfast with hand cheese and fried pork.

In Costa Rica, chorreadas are similar.

Etymology 
In Colombia, cachapas are known as arepas de choclo (corn arepas). 
In the Llanos Orientales, they are known as arepas de maiz jojoto or tierno (soft corn) 
 
In Costa Rica, the cachapas are called chorreadas (squirts) due to the liquid consistency before being cooked. This type has a little more sugar and adds a teaspoon of vanilla, which is served with eggs and Gallo pinto; this is great for a Costa Rican breakfast. 
 
In Seville, Spain, there is a similar word in the Chaima dialect, which is registered as an indigenous word "kachapa" to make a sweet arepa for the Chaima (Venezuelan tribe).

In Venezuela, the word "cachapera" refers to restaurants that sell this product. 
But in countries such as Venezuela and Puerto Rico, cachapera could also be a derogatory term for a lesbian.

History 

Cachapas are very prominent in Venezuelan cuisine. They have a long history, originating in pre-Columbian times when indigenous people would grind themselves the corn with stone and cook it under fireplaces. Many believe that cachapas originated between the American tribes known as chaima cultures. Still, others date this traditional dish to the Yanomami, Arawak, and Parias tribe between 500 and 1,800 years ago. The north-central region of Venezuela was known for cultivating sweet corn and using it for a special occasion to make cachapas. Today, this product can be bought pre-made or going to a specific restaurant for it, but many locals prefer to eat them as street food, knowing they are homemade, are the best. The cachapas have adopted many shapes and forms during the years and have accommodated restrictive diets such as vegetarian or gluten-free. The corn's presence has remained stable in Venezuelan cuisine as they use sweet corn in many of their main dishes, such as arepas, empanadas, and cachapas. Consumers can find the cachapas in any type of establishment, from the street truck to high-end restaurants, due to their popularity and significance in the country. 
This Venezuelan food is fried and made with fresh corn, and modern cachapas are made with the addition of several ingredients such as salt and sugar to improve the flavor in them. Modern cachapas are made with a combination of corn, milk, salt, water, and sugar, and fillings like roasted pork and queso de mano ("hand[made] cheese") have been introduced by restaurants. Nowadays, people have skipped the fresh corn and switched to canned corn or frozen to speed up the process and modernized it to be more comfortable.

Characteristics 

Cachapas are usually served folded in half with lots of butter and the desired filling inside. They have a crispy exterior, and the inside is tender to simulate the texture of a pancake. Still, the color of the cachapas is yellowish due to the cornmeal, which makes it easier to differentiate between American pancakes and Venezuelan "pancakes."

Preparation  
The batter is made with corn, sugar, eggs, milk, salt, cornflour (preferably Harina P.A.N), and melted butter in a food processor. The batter is placed on a non-stick skillet and shaped like a pancake. Once poured, cook for 4–5 minutes on each side and then enjoy with your favorite toppings and meats.

See also
 List of pancakes

References

Pancakes
Tortilla-based dishes
Venezuelan cuisine
Appetizers
Colombian cuisine